Two ships of the United States Navy have been named USS McCalla for Bowman H. McCalla.

This ship was sunk in 1941.
  was a  commissioned in 1942 and transferred to the Turkish Navy as TCG Giresun (D‑345) in 1949. This ship was scrapped in 1973.

United States Navy ship names